The Kolb Mark III is a family of American side-by-side two seater, high wing, strut-braced, pusher configuration, conventional landing gear-equipped ultralight aircraft that is produced in kit form by New Kolb Aircraft of London, Kentucky, and intended for amateur construction.

Design and development
The Mark III's standard engine was originally the  Rotax 582 engine, but the current engines offered are the   Rotax 912UL or the  Rotax 912ULS. In its home country the aircraft is normally licensed in the Experimental - amateur-built category.

The design features a forward fuselage of welded 4130 steel tubing, mated to an aluminum tailboom. The horizontal stabilizer, tail fin and wings are also constructed of riveted aluminum tubing with all flying surfaces covered in doped aircraft fabric. The wings and horizontal tail are quick-folding for storage and ground transport. The original Mark III can be made ready to fly from trailering in eight minutes by one person without the use of tools, while the newer M3X variant is rated at 15 minutes to assemble for flight.

Factory options include brakes, Ballistic Recovery Systems airframe parachute and powder coating of the steel parts. The manufacturer describes the aircraft as STOL, with a  take-off run.

Operational history
In reviewing the aircraft Andre Cliche said:

Variants
Mark III
Two seats in side-by-side configuration, high wing ultralight, powered by a  Rotax 503,  Rotax 582,  Rotax 618 or  Rotax 912UL engine. Variously marketed at different times as the Mark III, Twinstar and Mark III Classic.
Mark III Xtra
Two seats in side-by-side configuration, high wing ultralight, powered by an  Rotax 912UL engine, the  Rotax 912ULS or the  Jabiru 2200. The Xtra underwent an aerodynamic cleanup by aerodynamicist Barnaby Wainfan and was introduced in 1999. Variously marketed as the Mark III Xtra and the M3X.

Specifications (Mark III)

See also

References

External links

Mark III
1990s United States ultralight aircraft